The 1974 United States Senate election in Alabama took place on November 5, 1974. Incumbent Democratic U.S. Senator James B. Allen ran for re-election to a second term in office and succeeded easily, with only nominal opposition in the Democratic primary and general election. 

With no Republican opponent, the Democratic primary on August 6 was tantamount to election.

Democratic primary

Candidates
 James B. Allen, incumbent U.S. Senator
 John Taylor, Double Springs businessman

Results

General election

See also 
 1974 United States Senate elections

References

1974
Alabama
United States Senate